{{Taxobox
| name = Marinobacterium rhizophilum
| domain = Bacteria
| phylum = Pseudomonadota
| classis = Gammaproteobacteria
| ordo = Alteromonadales
| familia = Alteromonadaceae
| genus = Marinobacterium
| species = M. rhizophilum| binomial = Marinobacterium rhizophilum| binomial_authority = Kim et al. 2008
| type_strain = CL-YJ9, DSM 18822, KCCM 42386
| subdivision = 
| synonyms = Marinobacterium rhizophila
}}Marinobacterium rhizophilum'  is a Gram-negative and strictly aerobic bacterium from the genus of Marinobacterium'' which has been isolated from sediments near the roots of the plant Suaeda japonica from Eulwangri beach in Korea.

References

 

Alteromonadales
Bacteria described in 2008